Espen Klouman Høiner (born 31 August 1981, in Nesodden, Akershus) is a Norwegian writer and actor. He graduated from Westerdals School of Communication and Norwegian National Academy of Theatre in Oslo. He first appeared in the teen drama Bare Bea (2004), but gained recognition as an aspiring writer in the Joachim Trier movie Reprise in 2006. He also played in Switch (2007) and Must Have Been Love (2013).

Filmography
 The Heavy Water War (TV series) (2015)
 Must Have Been Love (2013)
 Upperdog (2009)
 Uti vår hage (TV series) (2008)
 Switch (2007)
 Reprise (2006)
 Bare Bea (2004)

Awards
 Won the Kanon Award (2013) in the Best Actor category, for his role in It Must Have Been Love.
 Won the Hedda Award (2013) in the Best Supporting Actor category for his role as Biff Loman in the plays Death of a Salesman and Ivar Zolen in Bør Børson

External links
Espen Klouman Høiner, Aschehoug Forlag
Espen Klouman Høiner, Trøndelag Teater
Espen Klouman Høiner, Filmweb

1981 births
Living people
People from Nesodden
Oslo National Academy of the Arts alumni
Norwegian male film actors
Norwegian male television actors
21st-century Norwegian male actors